Timaru International Motor Raceway is a motor racing circuit situated about 10 minutes or  outside of Timaru, New Zealand. The circuit is accessible from either State Highway 1 or the Timaru-Pleasant Point Highway. It is often called Levels because of its previous name Levels Raceway. The Timaru International Motor Raceway holds some of the major sporting events on New Zealand's motorsport calendar.

History

Before Timaru International Motor Raceway was born there was The South Canterbury Car Club Inc, which was formed in 1947 and were only running hillclimbs and paddock events at the time. The club progressed from this to running the Waimate 50 Street Race on the streets of Waimate until 1966. In 1967 a street event was run in Timaru in the Craigie Avenue area. Land was then purchased at Falvey Road and a permanent  circuit built, the first event held there was in November that year. The club continued to develop the venue running club and National Championship racing.

One of the events of Southern Festival of Speed, Bruce Pigeon Memorial, was held on 9 February to 10 February 2008.

The circuit
The  car racing track's surface is hard on tyres and brakes because it is chip tarmac. It has a mixture of tight "first and second" gear and fast flowing corners. It is rated FIA grade 3.

Lap Records 

The official lap record for the Timaru International Motor Raceway is 0:56.260, set by Greg Murphy on January 1995. The official race lap records at the Timaru International Motor Raceway are listed as:

Notes

References

External links
Official Site

Motorsport venues in New Zealand
Sports venues in Canterbury, New Zealand
Sport in Timaru